The Joseph Spaulding House is an historic house at 30 Fruit Street in Pawtucket, Rhode Island. It is a -story wood-frame structure, five bays wide, with a side-gable roof and a large central chimney. It is set in a hillside, and its basement, made of fieldstone, is used as an additional story. Built in 1828, with an ell added in 1850, it is one of the city's least-altered and best-preserved Federal style houses.

The house was listed on the National Register of Historic Places in 1976.

See also
National Register of Historic Places listings in Pawtucket, Rhode Island

References

Houses on the National Register of Historic Places in Rhode Island
Houses in Pawtucket, Rhode Island
National Register of Historic Places in Pawtucket, Rhode Island
Historic district contributing properties in Rhode Island
Houses completed in 1828